Metelitsa, metelytsya or miacielica is a popular folk dance from Ukraine, Russia, and Belarus. This dance abounds in swift changes of choreographed figures of a spinning nature, symbolizing a snowstorm.  The dance still retains its Khorovod character, the ancient form of group dancing and choral singing with the many figures in a circle form.  In the past the Metelystia was danced to only choral accompaniment.  In the late 19th and early 20th century besides singing the song, it was accompanied by the bandura or sometimes an instrumental ensemble.

See also 
 Russian folk dances
 Ukrainian dance

Ukrainian folk dances
Russian folk dances
Belarusian folk dances
Group dances